Frances Johnson was the last fluent speaker of the Takelma language.

Fran(ces) Johnson may also refer to:

Frances Johnson, novel by Stacey Levine
Frances Beverly Johnson, wife of Thomas S. Monson
Frances Reynolds Johnson, actress and wife of William V. B. Van Dyck
Begum Johnson (1728–1812), née Frances Croke, an eminent inhabitant of British Calcutta
Fran Johnson, DC Comics character

See also
Francis Johnson (disambiguation)
Frances Johnston, photographer